SWEAT is an OLN/TSN show hosted by Julie Zwillich that aired in 2003–2004.

Each of the 13 half-hour episodes of SWEAT features a different outdoor sport: kayaking, mountain biking, ice hockey, beach volleyball, soccer, windsurfing, rowing, Ultimate, triathlon, wakeboarding, snowboarding, telemark skiing and kiteboarding. Guest experts provide examples of the latest sport-specific gear, and techniques as well as provide nutrition and training tips for entry-level participation.  Some of SWEATs guest athletes include, Olympic beach volleyball bronze medallists John Child and Mark Heese, Canada’s young soccer superstar Kara Lang, snowboarding champion Alexa Loo and women's hockey Olympic gold medallist Sami Jo Small.

References

External links
SWEAT page on the Peace Point Entertainment Group website

2003 Canadian television series debuts
2004 Canadian television series endings
2000s Canadian sports television series
English-language television shows
OLN original programming